is a passenger railway station in located in the town of  Tamaki,  Watarai District, Mie Prefecture, Japan, operated by Central Japan Railway Company (JR Tōkai).

Lines
Tamaru Station is served by the Sangū Line, and is located 7.0 rail kilometers from the terminus of the line at Taki Station.

Station layout
The station consists of two opposed side platforms, connected by a level crossing. The station is unattended.

Platforms

Adjacent stations

|-

History
Tamaru Station opened on December 31, 1893, as a station on the privately owned Sangū Railway. The line was nationalized on October 1, 1907, becoming part of the Japanese Government Railway (JGR), which became the Japan National Railways (JNR) after World War II. The current station building was completed in 1912. The station was absorbed into the JR Central network upon the privatization of the JNR on April 1, 1987. The station has been unattended since October 1, 2012.

Passenger statistics
In fiscal 2019, the station was used by an average of 550 passengers daily (boarding passengers only).

Surrounding area
Tamaru Castle ruins
Tamaki Town Hall

See also
List of railway stations in Japan

References

External links

Railway stations in Japan opened in 1893
Railway stations in Mie Prefecture
Tamaki, Mie